Kyle Davis Richardson (born March 2, 1973) is a former National Football League punter. He played college football at Arkansas State University and went on to have a ten-year professional career. He played for the Rhein Fire in NFL Europe in 1996, the Miami Dolphins and Seattle Seahawks in 1997, the Baltimore Ravens from 1998 to 2001, the Minnesota Vikings in 2002, the Cincinnati Bengals from 2003 to 2004, and the Cleveland Browns in 2005. With the Ravens, he won Super Bowl XXXV over the New York Giants.

High school and college
Richardson attended high school at Farmington Senior High School. During his time at Farmington, he played football, basketball, and track. In his high school football career, Richardson played the positions of defensive back, punter, placekicker, and wide receiver, and was a three-year starter and All-conference/All-region member of the football team those three years.

NFL career 
Richardson was a member of the Baltimore Ravens team that won Super Bowl XXXV. He, along with New York Giants punter Brad Maynard, hold the record for most punts (both teams) in a Super Bowl with 21 punts.  
Maynard holds the individual record with 11 punts (38.4 yd/avg) and Richardson is second with 10 punts (43.0 yd/avg.).

References

1973 births
Living people
American football punters
Arkansas State Red Wolves football players
Rhein Fire players
Miami Dolphins players
Seattle Seahawks players
Baltimore Ravens players
Minnesota Vikings players
Philadelphia Eagles players
Cincinnati Bengals players
Cleveland Browns players
People from Farmington, Missouri